The 2023 Davis Cup World Group I will be held on 15–17 September. The twelve winners from the World Group I will play at the qualifying round and the twelve losers will play at the World Group I Play-offs in 2024.

Teams
Twenty-four teams will participate in the World Group I, in series decided on a home and away basis. The seedings are based on the Nations Ranking.

These twenty-four teams are:
12 losing teams from the 2023 qualifying round, in February 2023
12 winning teams from the 2023 World Group I Play-offs, in February 2023

The 12 winning teams from the World Group I will play at the qualifying round and the 12 losing teams will play at the World Group I Play-offs in 2024.

#: Nations Ranking as of 6 February 2023.

Seeded teams
  (#5)
  (#14)
  (#16)
  (#18)
  (#19)
  (#22)
  (#23)
  (#24)
  (#25)
  (#26)
  (#27)
  (#28)

Unseeded teams
  (#29)
  (#30)
  (#31)
  (#33)
  (#34)
  (#35)
  (#36)
  (#37)
  (#38)
  (#39)
  (#41)
  (#42)

Results summary

Results

Bosnia and Herzegovina vs. Germany

Bulgaria vs. Kazakhstan

Belgium vs. Uzbekistan

Argentina vs. Lithuania

Ukraine vs. Colombia

Hungary vs. Turkey

Israel vs. Japan

Austria vs. Portugal

Greece vs. Slovakia

Peru vs. Norway

Romania vs. Chinese Taipei

Denmark vs. Brazil

References

External links
Draw

World Group I